.aq is the Internet country code top-level domain (ccTLD) for Antarctica (itself not a country). It is derived from the French Antarctique and is reserved for organizations that work in Antarctica or promote the Antarctic and Southern Ocean regions. It is administered by Peter Mott of Antarctica Network Information Centre Limited from Christchurch, New Zealand.

.aq domain names are available free of charge, and registration is granted for a period of 24 months. As a general rule, registrants are only allocated a single .aq domain name. The registry does not have a website. Registration is only possible by contacting Antarctica Network Information Centre Limited.

See also 

 Telecommunications in Antarctica

References

External links 
 IANA .aq whois information
 FAQ for the .aq registry
 Top-Level-Domain .AQ  (information site about .aq)

Communications in Antarctica
Country code top-level domains
Computer-related introductions in 1992
1992 establishments in Antarctica

sv:Toppdomän#A